Frederick Philip Hummel (March 12, 1856 – October 15, 1915) was a lawyer and politician from New York City.

Life 
Hummel was born on March 12, 1856, in New York City, New York, the son of German immigrants Philip Hummel and Sophie Merx.

Hummel attended public schools. He worked as a law clerk from 1869 to 1879. He began attending the New York University School of Law in 1878 and graduated from there with an LL.B. in 1879. He was then admitted to the bar and began practicing law in New York City. In 1892, he was elected to the New York State Assembly as a Democrat, representing the New York County 24th District. He served in the Assembly in 1893. While in the Assembly, he introduced a bill to punish people for obtaining property under false pretenses. He became active in real estate developments in Yorkville in 1890. By the time he died, he was a member of the law firm Hummel & Holbert.

In 1885, Hummel married Katie Goldsmith. They had three daughters.

Hummel died at home in Marble Hill on October 15, 1915. He was buried in Woodlawn Cemetery.

References

External links 

 The Political Graveyard

1856 births
1915 deaths
American people of German descent
New York University School of Law alumni
19th-century American lawyers
20th-century American lawyers
Lawyers from New York City
19th-century American politicians
Politicians from Manhattan
Democratic Party members of the New York State Assembly
Burials at Woodlawn Cemetery (Bronx, New York)